The  is a large pumped-storage hydroelectric power station in Asago, in the Hyōgo Prefecture of Japan. 
The facility is currently run by the Kansai Electric Power Company.

Like most pumped-storage facilities, the power station utilizes two reservoirs, releasing and pumping as the demand rises and falls. 
Construction on the facility began in 1970 and was completed in 1974.

Kurokawa Reservoir 

Tataragi Reservoir 

See also 

 List of power stations in Japan

Notes

Energy infrastructure completed in 1974
Hyōgo Prefecture
Pumped-storage hydroelectric power stations in Japan